The 1953–54 Segunda División season was the 23rd since its establishment and was played between 12 September 1953 and 25 April 1954.

Overview before the season
32 teams joined the league, including two relegated from the 1952–53 La Liga and 8 promoted from the 1952–53 Tercera División.

Relegated from La Liga
Málaga
Zaragoza

Promoted from Tercera División

La Felguera
Eibar
Escoriaza
Badajoz
Castellón
Xerez
Cultural Leonesa
España Tánger

Group North

Teams

League table

Results

Top goalscorers

Top goalkeepers

Group South

Teams

League table

Results

Top goalscorers

Top goalkeepers

Promotion playoffs

League table

Results

Relegation playoffs

Group 1

League table

Results

Group 2

League table

Results

External links
BDFútbol

Segunda División seasons
2
Spain